The New Swedish People's League was a Nazi organization in Sweden. The organization was founded on 19 January 1930, as members of the National Socialist People's Party of Sweden in western Sweden rebelled against the party leader Konrad Hallgren. Stig Bille was the leader of the New Swedish People's League. On 15 March 1930 the organization began publish Vår Kamp ('Our Struggle') as its organ. On 1 October 1930 the organization merged into the New Swedish National League.

In Uppsala, Per Engdahl was a prominent member of the organization.

References

Nationalist parties in Sweden
Political parties established in 1930
Political parties disestablished in 1930
Defunct political parties in Sweden
Nazism in Sweden
Nazi parties
Antisemitism in Europe